Kamran Mirza (1512 – 5 October 1557) was the second son of Babur, the founder of the Mughal Empire and the first Mughal Emperor. Kamran Mirza was born in Kabul to Babur's wife Gulrukh Begum. He was half-brother to Babur's eldest son Humayun, who would go on and inherit the Mughal throne, but he was full-brother to Babur's third son, Askari. A divan written in Persian and Chagatai is attributed to him.

During the Reign of Babur
While his father, Babur, was conquering northern India from 1525 onwards, Kamran remained in Kandahar in order to secure his northern flank. He was still in charge of the northern part of the newly formed empire, when his father died in 1530. According to the Mughal historian Abul Fazl, Babur's last words to Humayun were "do nothing against your brothers, even though they may deserve it".

In India
In 1538, Kamran first crossed into India, bringing with him 12,000 soldiers, while Humayun was away fighting in Bengal. He appeared to have come in order to put down the rebellion of his brother Hindal against Humayun. However, despite Humayun's calls for help, Kamran offered him no aid whatsoever. After Humayun returned from his defeat at the Battle of Chausa, Kamran refused to place his troops under Humayun's command as he was more interested in taking power for himself. Seeing no chance of furthering his ambition, Kamran withdrew back to Lahore.

Rivalry with Humayun
Sher Shah defeated Humayun in the Battle of Kannauj in May 1540 and became the new ruler of northern India. He ordered Humayun to leave India. Humayun went back to Kabul but Kamran was unwilling to hand the city over to his brother. At this point Kamran went behind Humayun's back and offered to support Sher Shah, if the latter would give him the Punjab in return. His offer was refused. At this point Humayun was urged by his advisors to put his brother to death, but he refused.

After a series of disastrous attempts to retake his throne, Humayun crossed the Indus in 1543. Rather than welcoming him, Kamran sent his younger brother Askari out to catch him and bring him to Kabul. Humayun managed to escape his brother's clutches though and sought refuge in the court of the ruler of Persia, Shah Tahmasp I.

When Humayun was in Persia, Kamran offered the Shah the city of Kandahar if he would hand his brother over to him. Shah Tahmasp favoured Humayun in this fraternal squabble however, and provided him with troops with which he defeated Kamran.

Conflict over Kabul

Humayun was able to enter Kabul in November 1545 in a bloodless takeover, as Kamran's rule had been oppressive, and the population of the city was keen to be rid of him.

After his ignominious flight, Kamran managed to retake Kabul twice but he remained a hated figure to the residents of the city, as his periods of rule involved atrocities against large numbers of them.

Following his third and final ejection from Kabul, Kamran went to the court of Humayun's enemy, the Afghan king Islam Shah in Delhi in 1552, where he was effectively rebuffed in his hopes for an alliance against his brother. Islam Shah arrested him and deputed his trusted adviser Hemu to hand over Kamran to Humayun at Kabul.

Architecture

A significant architectural structure built for Kamran exists today in Lahore. It is called Kamran ki Baradari. Bara means twelve and dar means doors. Kamran ki baradari was a twelve-door building on the bank of River Ravi. The river changed its course over time, with the result that the Baradari stands not on the bank but in the waters as an island while the gardens have deteriorated.

Exile and death
Although Humayun resisted the pressure to put his rebellious brother to death, he was persuaded that something needed to be done about him so he reluctantly had him blinded. Humayun then sent him off to perform the Hajj to Mecca, where he died near in 1557 and took throne of Kabul from sons of Kamran Mirza and sent them to Attock Fort as Sirdars.

Family

Consorts
Kamran had eight consorts:
Gulrukh Begum ( 1528), daughter of his maternal uncle, Amir Sultan Ali Mirza Taghai Begchik;
Muhtarima Khanum, daughter of Shah Muhammad Sultan Jagatai, Sultan of Kashghar, by his wife, Khadija Sultan Khanum, fourth daughter of Sultan Ahmad Khan Jagatai;
Hazara Begum, niece of the Hazara chief, Khizr Khan;
Mah Begum, daughter of Sultan Uwais Qibchaq, of Kulab, sometime Governor of Badakshan;
Mihr Afroz Bega, mother of Hajji Begum;
Daulat Bakht Aghacha, mother of Aisha Sultan Begum;
Mah Chuchak Begum ( 1546;  1558), daughter of Mir Shah Husain Arghun, Lord of Sind, Kandahar and Kabul, by his wife, Mah Chuchak Begum, daughter of Mirza Muhammad Muqim Beg Aghun;
A sister of Abdullah Khan Mughal;

Sons
Kamran had two sons:
Ibrahim Sultan Mirza;
Abu'l-Qasim Mirza;

Daughters
Kamran had five daughters:
Habiba Begum, married in 1545 Yasin ud-Daula Aq Sultan, son of Aiman Khwajah Sultan, son of Ahmad Alaq, the Khan of Moghulistan, divorced in 1551
Gulrukh Begum, married Ibrahim Husain Mirza, third son of Sultan Muhammad Mirza, of Azampur, sometime Governor of Sambhal;
Hajji Begum - with Mihr Afroz Bega, went on the pilgrimage to Mecca in October 1575;
Gulizar Begum, went on the pilgrimage to Mecca in October 1575;
Aisha Sultan Begum - with Daulat Bakht Aghcha; went to Taloqan with her father in 1550. In 1551, she and her mother were in flight for Kandahar, but were captured at the Khimar Pass, and brought in by Humayun's people;

References

Sources
 The Great Moghuls by Bamber Gascoigne

External links
 Divan manuscript (www.fihrist.org.uk)

Mughal princes
Turkic rulers
1509 births
1557 deaths
People from Kabul
Timurid dynasty